Richwoods Township is located in Peoria County, Illinois. The geographic designation is Township 9 North, Range 8 East of the Fourth Principal Meridian. As of the 2010 census, its population was 6,089 and it contained 3,048 housing units.  The majority of its area is the village of Peoria Heights, Illinois.

History
Part of Richwoods Township was given to City of Peoria Township when it was organized as a township in 1907.  Until 1991, the City of Peoria Township grew as the city of Peoria did, and today, most of what was originally Richwoods Township lies within the 1991 city limits of Peoria, and therefore in the Township of the City of Peoria; however, small parts of Richwoods Township's northern sections remained when the boundaries of the Township of the City of Peoria were fixed in place by law in the 1990s, and these, along with the entire village of Peoria Heights, remain as Richwoods Township.

Geography

Cities, towns, and villages
Peoria (small portion)
Peoria Heights (vast majority)

Demographics

See also
 Peoria Heights, Illinois
 Peoria Heights High School
 Richwoods High School

References

External links
City-data.com
Illinois State Archives

Townships in Peoria County, Illinois
Peoria metropolitan area, Illinois
Townships in Illinois